Filatima perpensa is a moth of the family Gelechiidae. It is found in North America, where it has been recorded from California.

The wingspan is 18–22 mm. The forewings are fuscous, streaked and overlaid with brownish-ochreous scales. The basal angle is marked with a black dash and there are small blackish fuscous spots on the anal vein at the basal third slightly above this in the cell and at the end of the cell. An ill-defined pale costal spot indicates an obsolete transverse line at the apical fourth. The hindwings are dark fuscous.

References

Moths described in 1947
Filatima